Endopeptidase So (E. coli cytoplasmic proteinase, proteinase So, Escherichia coli serine proteinase So) is an enzyme. This enzyme catalyses the following chemical reaction

 Hydrolysis of proteins, but not Bz-Tyr-OEt, Ac-Phe-beta-naphthylester, or Bz-Arg-OEt

This is an Escherichia coli cytoplasmic endopeptidase.

References

External links 
 

EC 3.4.21